Porky's Romance is a 1937 Warner Bros. Looney Tunes cartoon directed by Frank Tashlin. The short was released on April 3, 1937, and stars Porky Pig and Petunia Pig, in her debut appearance.

Plot
The cartoon opens with an introduction of Petunia Pig; Petunia is shown as nervous, tripping on her lines and being unable to pronounce them correctly while on stage, leading an off-screen announcer (voiced by Alan Reed) to quietly tell her not to get excited. This causes her to go into an explosive rant and then the curtain closes on her and the main part of the cartoon starts.

Porky is shown buying some flowers, candy, and then eventually a diamond ring. He proceeds to go over to Petunia's house and knock on the door, then Petunia goes to answer the door with her spoiled dog, Fluffnums. When she sees Porky, she is disgusted to see him so she disdainfully tells him to go away. This causes him to leave crying out of sadness and he then walks away, but Fluffnums sees the candy Porky has and alerts her to this fact.

Petunia proceeds to run out after Porky and take him into her house, where she rips open the candy container and starts eating the candy. Porky tries to help himself to the candy several times but is constantly harassed by Fluffnums, who snarls and growls at him each time he tries to reach for the candy box. Porky finally gets a piece of candy, winks at the audience, and then finds out that Fluffnums ate it. He eventually tries to propose to Petunia, but as he is starting to do so, Fluffnums pulls a mean-spirited trick on Porky by pulling the rug out from under him. The fickle and selfish Petunia laughs at him, causing Porky to leave the house and walk off in shame. He proceeds to write a suicide note and tries to hang himself from a tree, but the branch the rope is on snaps due to Porky's weight, knocking him out and causing him to go into a dreamlike state.

Porky dreams that he is at a church marrying Petunia. After the ceremony, they head off on their honeymoon and the couple get together there as a message "Time... munches on!" is displayed on screen, and sounds of Petunia eating candy can be heard. The screen then shows Porky having to do all the housework while Petunia is essentially a couch potato; she has become fat and lazy, and Fluffnums has done the same thing. Eventually, Porky's kids (all of whom are named "Porky Pig Jr.") are woken up when a stack of dishes accidentally falls over on him from the kitchen counter. He tries to put them back to sleep after Petunia yells at him to "shut those kids up". He meekly tells her he is trying his best to do so, but Petunia yells at him for back-talking her and she beats him over the head repeatedly with a rolling pin while the kids cheer her on.

Porky awakes from the dream by Petunia gently brushing him and accepting his proposal. When he remembers Petunia's horrid treatment of him in his dream and fears what his future could hold for him if he marries her, he proceeds to take his gifts and runs off. He returns to punish Fluffnums for his ill behavior toward him by kicking him in the rear, making the dog yelp in pain while Porky runs off again, leaving a dazed and confused Petunia behind.

Production notes
Porky's Romance is significant in that it is the last cartoon that had Joe Dougherty as the voice of Porky Pig before Mel Blanc got the job and exclusive voice credit contract. Dougherty's uncontrollable stutter had made it extremely difficult for the producers to work with him; such frustrations were evident in the cartoon's production, much of which has Porky either as a silent character or one who only speaks with his face turned away from the view of the audience.

Petunia's rant ("Excited?! Who's excited?! I'm not excited!!") was done by Mel Blanc, and was reused and sped up in a later Porky cartoon Porky and Gabby.

References

External links
 

1937 films
Looney Tunes shorts
Warner Bros. Cartoons animated short films
1930s American animated films
Short films directed by Frank Tashlin
Porky Pig films
Films scored by Carl Stalling
1937 animated films
Animated films about animals
Films about pigs
American black-and-white films